Entomobrya unostrigata, the cotton springtail, is a species of slender springtails in the family Entomobryidae.

Subspecies
These two subspecies belong to the species Entomobrya unostrigata:
 Entomobrya unostrigata dorsosignata Stach, 1963 g
 Entomobrya unostrigata unostrigata Stach, 1930 g
Data sources: i = ITIS, c = Catalogue of Life, g = GBIF, b = Bugguide.net

References

Further reading

 

Entomobryomorpha
Articles created by Qbugbot
Animals described in 1930